This Mad World is a 1930 American pre-Code film directed by William C. deMille and starring Basil Rathbone, Kay Johnson and Louise Dresser. A drama, it sees a French spy return home to German-occupied France during World War I to find a German general living in his house.

Premise
In 1938, a French spy goes home and finds an evil German officer killed his family. He then return to his spying carrier to take revenge.

Cast
 Kay Johnson as Victoria
 Basil Rathbone as Paul Parisot
 Louise Dresser as Pauline Parisot - Paul's Mother
 Veda Buckland as Anna
 Louis Natheaux as Emile
 Wilhelm von Brincken as Victoria's husband - the General

References

1930 films
1930 drama films
1930s English-language films
Metro-Goldwyn-Mayer films
American drama films
1930s American films